is an interchange passenger railway station located in Chūō-ku, Chiba, Japan, operated by East Japan Railway Company (JR East) and the Chiba Urban Monorail.

Lines
Chibaminato Station is served by the JR East Keiyō Line and Chiba Urban Monorail Line 1. It is located 39.0 kilometers from the starting point of the Keiyō Line at Tokyo Station and is the terminal station for the Chiba Urban Monorail Line 1.

Station layout
The JR portion of the station consists of one side platform and one island platform serving three elevated tracks, with the station building underneath. The station is staffed. The Chiba Urban Monorail Chibaminato Station has two side platforms with two tracks between them, and is also an elevated station.

JR East platforms

Chiba Urban Monorail platforms

History
The JR East station opened on 3 March 1986. The station was absorbed into the JR East network upon the privatization of the Japan National Railways (JNR) on 1 April 1987.

Station numbering was introduced to the JR East platforms in 2016 with Chibaminato being assigned station number JE16.

Passenger statistics
In fiscal 2019, the JR portion of the station was used by an average of 17,199 passengers daily (boarding passengers only). In fiscal 2018, the China Urban Monolail portion of the station was served by 8,264 passengers.

Surrounding area
 Chiba city office
 Chiba-Chūō Police Station
 Chiba Port Tower
 Chiba Prefectural Museum of Art
 NHK Chiba broadcasting station
 Chiba Bank Head office

See also
 List of railway stations in Japan

References

External links

 JR East Chibaminato Station 
Chiba Urban Monorail station information

Railway stations in Japan opened in 1986
Railway stations in Chiba (city)
Keiyō Line